The 2001 Esiliiga is the 11th season of the Esiliiga, second-highest Estonian league for association football clubs, since its establishment in 1992.

Final table of Esiliiga season 2001

Promotion playoff

FC Lootus Kohtla-Järve beat FC Valga 2–2 on away goals rule. Lootus remained in Meistriliiga, Valga in Esiliiga.

Relegation playoff

TJK-83 Tallinn beat Hiiumaa ÜJK Emmaste 7–0 on aggregate. TJK-83 promoted to Esiliiga, Emmaste relegated to Second Division.

Top goalscorers 

26 – Andrei Afanasov (S.C. Real)
21 – Andrus Mitt (Levadia Pärnu)
17 – Andrei Usmanov (S.C. Real)
15 – Enver Jääger (Valga)

See also
 2001 Meistriliiga

Esiliiga seasons
2
Estonia
Estonia